Arcas is a crater on Jupiter's moon Callisto measuring  across. It is an example of a central pit impact crater. A smaller crater near Arcas is called Ginandi. The crater is named after Arcas, the son of Callisto in Greek mythology.

References

Surface features on Callisto (moon)
Impact craters on Jupiter's moons